Chekhov is a crater on Mercury. It has a diameter of 194 kilometers. Its name was adopted by the International Astronomical Union (IAU) in 1976. Chekhov is named for the Russian author Anton Chekhov, who lived from 1860 to 1904.

Chekhov is one of 110 peak ring basins on Mercury.

The small rayed crater Popova is to the west of Chekhov.  Unkei is to the north, Wergeland is to the east, and the similar-sized crater Schubert is to the southeast.

References

Impact craters on Mercury
Anton Chekhov